Povilas (Paul) Vaitonis (15 August 1911 in Užpaliai, Kovno Governorate – 23 April 1983 in Hamilton, Canada) was a Lithuanian–Canadian International Master of chess. He was a five-time Lithuanian champion, and was twice Canadian champion. Vaitonis was inducted into the Canadian Chess Hall of Fame on July 9, 2011 in Toronto.

Biography

Povilas Vaitonis played for Lithuania in four official and one unofficial Chess Olympiads. 
 In July 1933, he played at second board at 5th Chess Olympiad in Folkestone (+5 –5 =2).
 In August 1935, he played at fourth board at 6th Chess Olympiad in Warsaw (+5 –5 =3).
 In August/September 1936, he played at third board at 3rd unofficial Chess Olympiad in Munich (+12 –6 =2).
 In July/August 1937, he played at second board at 7th Chess Olympiad in Stockholm (+8 –5 =5).
 In August/September 1939, he played at second board at 8th Chess Olympiad in Buenos Aires (+6 –8 =6).

His total for Lithuania in Olympiads was (+36 -29 =18).

Vaitonis played three matches against Vladas Mikėnas. In 1934, he lost a match (2 : 6). In 1937, he lost a match (4,5 : 5,5). In 1938, he lost a match (3 : 9).

Vaitonis may have been the first player to use what is now called the Benko Gambit (1.d4 Nf6 2.c4 c5 3.d5 b5) in its most common move order, in a game against Thorvaldsson at the 1936 unofficial Olympiad at Munich.

Vaitonis became the Lithuanian Champion in 1934, 1937, 1938, 1942, and 1944. In July 1943, he took 4th place, behind Birmanas, Romanas Arlauskas, and Leonardas Abramavičius, at the 12th Lithuanian Championship in Vilnius. He left Lithuania just before the advancing Soviet forces arrived, to avoid deportation to Siberia or any other persecutions the Soviet occupation (e.g., those of Vladimirs Petrovs). Joining the westward exodus in 1944/45, he –- along with many other Baltic players, e.g. Arlauskas, Dreibergs, Endzelins, Jursevskis, Mednis, Ozols, Sarapu, Tautvaišas, Zemgalis, etc. -– moved to the West.

In 1948, he emigrated to Canada and settled in Hamilton, Ontario. He wrote a weekly chess column in The Hamilton Spectator 1953–1955. In 1949, he took 5th place at Canadian Championship in Arvida, Quebec. In 1951 and in 1957, he won Canadian Championships in Vancouver. In September–October 1952, he took 19th place at the 2nd Interzonal in Stockholm. In 1953, he took 3rd place in Canadian Championship in Winnipeg.

Paul Vaitonis played for Canada in two Olympiads. In September 1954, he played at third board at the 11th Chess Olympiad in Amsterdam (+6 –3 =5). In September/October 1958, he played at third board at the 13th Chess Olympiad in Munich (+4 –5 =5). His total for Canada in Olympiads was (+10 -8 =10).

In 1952, he was awarded the International Master title by FIDE. In the 1960s he continued playing in the Canadian Championships and on teams (Lithuanian Chess Club, McMaster).

Vaitonis was inducted into the Canadian Chess Hall of Fame on July 9, 2011 in Toronto.

Notable chess games 
Povilas Vaitonis vs Erich Eliskases, Folkestone 1933, 5th Olympiad, English Opening, Anglo-Indian Defense, Queen's Knight Variation, A16, 1-0
Povilas Vaitonis vs Movsas Feigins, Munich (ol) 1936, Queen's Gambit Declined, D53, 1-0 Black were so much engaged in their c5 pawn greedy ride they overlooked mate.
Octavio Trompowsky vs Povilas Vaitonis, Buenos Aires 1939, 8th Olympiad (f-A),  Trompowsky Attack, A45, 0-1
Paul Vaitonis vs Fedor Parfenovich Bohatirchuk, Vancouver 1951, CAN-ch, Queen's Pawn Game, A41, 1-0

External links
 CanadianChess.info biography

References

1911 births
1983 deaths
Canadian people of Lithuanian descent
Canadian chess players
Chess International Masters
Chess Olympiad competitors
Lithuanian chess players
Lithuanian refugees
People from Kovno Governorate
People from Utena District Municipality
Soviet emigrants to Canada
Sportspeople from Hamilton, Ontario
20th-century chess players